Cholet Island is a small island immediately north of the narrow peninsula which forms the western extremity of Booth Island, in the Wilhelm Archipelago. It was discovered by the French Antarctic Expedition, 1903–05, under Jean-Baptiste Charcot, who named it for Ernest Cholet, skipper of the ship Français, and later, the Pourquoi-Pas?.

Maignan Point marks the northeast end of Cholet Island and the west side of the entrance to Port Charcot, lying close off the northwest part of Booth Island. It was named by Charcot for F. Maignan, a seaman of the Francais.

Rozo Point marks the northwest end of Cholet Island. It was named by Charcot for M. Rozo, the cook on the Français. Libois Bay is a cove on the west side of Cholet Island which is entered between Rozo Point and Paumelle Point, the northwest end of Booth Island. It was named by Charcot for F. Libois, second mechanic and carpenter on the Français.

See also 
 List of Antarctic and sub-Antarctic islands

References

 

Islands of the Wilhelm Archipelago